Haberfeld Stadium (Itztadion Haberfeld; also known as the Superland Stadium) is a multi-purpose stadium in Rishon LeZion, Israel.  It is currently used mostly for football matches and is the home stadium of Hapoel Rishon LeZion. The stadium holds 6,000 and was built in 1993.

The stadium is named after former Israel Football Association chairman Haim Haberfeld.

Gallery

References 

 

Hapoel Rishon LeZion F.C.
Football venues in Israel
Multi-purpose stadiums in Israel
Sports venues completed in 1995
Sports venues in Central District (Israel)
1995 establishments in Israel